Lanceros Boyacá was a Colombian Categoría Primera B football team based in Tunja. The team was founded in 1993. Lanceros Boyacá is recognized for being the first professional team of the Colombia national team player Radamel Falcao.

Notable players
 Radamel Falcao

Football clubs in Colombia
Categoría Primera B clubs